Autograph Collector Magazine was a U.S. magazine for autograph collectors.  The magazine was started in 1986. They offered news, celebrity interviews and addresses, in-person signing event listings, counterfeit-detection articles, and in-depth articles on collecting autographs from people in various professions, from sports to Hollywood to business and more. The magazine was, in its later incarnation, a web-only publication. The print version was previously published on a monthly basis.

The magazine was headquartered in Corona, California.

References

External links
Autograph Collector Magazine

Monthly magazines published in the United States
Online magazines published in the United States
Celebrity magazines published in the United States
Hobby magazines published in the United States
Magazines established in 1986
Magazines published in California
Mass media in Corona, California
Online magazines with defunct print editions